Harry Marshall Buland (June 10, 1884 – July 14, 1933) was an American football and basketball coach. He served as the head football coach at Bethany College in Bethany, West Virginia from 1920 to 1921. He was a graduate of Eastern Michigan University–then known as Ypsilanti Normal School.

Buland began his coaching career at Jacksonville High School in Jacksonville, Illinois.

References

External links
 

1884 births
1933 deaths
Bethany Bison football coaches
High school football coaches in West Virginia
High school basketball coaches in Illinois
Sportspeople from Minnesota